Aleko Axel August Eugen Lilius (2 April189024June 1977) was an explorer, businessman, diplomat, writer, journalist, and photographer of Finnish, Swedish, and Russian extraction. He has been described as an English journalist, a Russian Finn, an American of Finnish origin, a Swedish journalist and adventurer, and an intrepid American journalist.  He is the author of I Sailed with Chinese Pirates, an account of the time he spent among pirates of the South China seas.

Biography
Lilius was born in Saint Petersburg, Russia, on 2 April1890. His father was a senior translator for the Senate of Finland and served as a staff captain in the Izmaylovsky Regiment. His mother was Natalia Starck who was born in the Caucasus and was the daughter of major general Julius Starck.

Before World War I, Lilius was an enterprising businessman whose colorful exploits attracted much publicity.

As a young man, he explored much of the Americas, China, North Africa, and South Africa, before settling down for a while in the Philippines. Lilius' writing was based on his wide-ranging travels in places such as China, Morocco, and Mexico. The first mention of Lilius as a writer is as the author of the script for the 1919 Finnish film  (In Search of Venus or The Marvelous Adventures of a Young Man). In China in 1927, he rescued the remnants of the American flag from the looted American consulate in Nanking. While in the Philippines, he participated in a project to photograph the Bugkalot tribe. During the 1920s and 1930s, Lilius worked as a foreign correspondent in Asia and North Africa. During the 1920s, he worked with linguist Rudolf Schuller as a photographer in Mexico. In the 1930s, Lilius lived in the United States, residing in the Armour–Stiner Octagon House in Irvington, New York.

He ran into conflict with the law several times in the 1930s. According to an article in the Singaporean The Straits Times, Lilius was convicted of fraud and "sentenced to two months hard labour" in 1929. Four years later while in the Philippines, he was again pronounced guilty of fraud for issuing four checks with insufficient funds and was sentenced to one year and one day in prison plus required to pay what he owed. Lilius appealed to a higher court for a reversal of the lower court's decision; his appeal was successful and the charges were reversed.

Lilius sued a Philippine railroad company after the car in which he and has family were traveling was hit by a locomotive in 1931. Although he won the suit in a lower court, the railroad company appealed to the Supreme Court. Lilius again succeeded and was awarded P30,865.

In the 1950s he lived in Morocco. In 1958 he moved to Helsinki, Finland, and later devoted himself to painting. Lilius died on 24June 1977 in Helsinki, Finland.

Works

I Sailed with Chinese Pirates 
Lilius is primarily remembered as the author of I Sailed with Chinese Pirates, an account of the time he spent among the pirates of the South China seas. The original review in The New York Times (27July 1931) reads in part:

Lai Choi San is widely believed to be the source of inspiration for the character of the Dragon Lady, the oriental femme fatale in Milton Caniff"s comic strip Terry and the Pirates. Lilius referred to Lai Choi San as Queen of the Pirates rather than Dragon Lady, but Caniff did use the Chinese name for his character. According to one source, this was the cause of a later legal dispute between Lilius and the syndicate that produced the comic strip.

A review of the 1991 Oxford University Press reprint says the book is "a good read in the sensational nineteen-twenties style of journalism ... briskly moving but somewhat superficial".

Partial bibliography
 (1919) Herr C.G's politiska affärer (Mr. C G's Political Affairs)
 (1920s) Extensive photography for the Rudolf Schuller Papers. These papers consist of field notes, vocabulary lists, manuscripts, and photos from Schuller's studies of a variety of Mexican and Central American Indian languages and dialects, with particular emphasis on the culture and language of the Huastecan Indians. The collection is now in the hands of the Middle American Research Institute of Tulane University.
 (1928) Min kinesiska Krigsbok (My Chinese War Diary). Publisher: Hökerbergs
 (1931) 
 (1948) The Romantic Thousand Islands, Their Towns and Times. Publisher: Holliday Publications Ltd., Canada.
 (1956) 
 (1956) Ung man i farten (Memoirs: A Young Man's Journey)
 (1957) Ett herrans liv (Memoirs: A Gentleman's Life)
 (1962) The Romantic Thousand Islands: Photographs – Maps – History. Publisher: Wallace
 Lilius also published a number of free-lance articles in magazines such as Argosy (UK) (May 1947), Stag (Feb 1952), Adventure Magazine (Jan 1953), The Wide World (Sep 1930, Publisher: George Newnes Ltd, London); and The Sphere Illustrated Newspaper (London) (4 July 1931), which was "a brief sketch of the Sultan of Sulu, courted by the U.S. in an effort to defuse Moro hostility during its governance of the Philippines"; and (1964) The Sultan of Sulu tells how England 'stole' North Borneo.
 (1991)

References

External links
 Lilius, Aleko in the Biografiskt lexikon för Finland. 
  Excerpt from the Arthur Ransome website.

1890 births
1977 deaths
20th-century Finnish businesspeople
Finnish writers
American writers
Finnish writers in Swedish
20th-century Finnish writers
20th-century Finnish journalists
20th-century Finnish photographers
20th-century American photographers
Burials at Hietaniemi Cemetery
American people of Finnish descent
Finnish expatriates in Mexico
Finnish expatriates in Morocco
Finnish expatriates in the Philippines
Finnish expatriates in the United States
People of Caucasus descent